Kapital is a weekly newspaper from North Macedonia.

References

Newspapers published in North Macedonia
Macedonian-language newspapers
Magazines published in North Macedonia